Montgomery Woods State Natural Reserve is a 1,323-acre (535 ha) state-owned park located in the Coastal Range in Mendocino County, California, United States. The Reserve occupies the headwaters of Montgomery Creek, a tributary of Big River, which flows into the Pacific Ocean at Mendocino Headlands State Park. The virgin groves of Coast Redwood (Sequoia sempervirens) in Montgomery Woods are examples of a now rare upland riparian meadow habitat; most other preserved redwood groves are on broad alluvial plains. A moderately steep trail from the parking area climbs uphill along Montgomery Creek about three-quarters of a mile. Once in the grove, the trail makes a meandering  loop, with substantial use of boardwalks to protect the fragile forest floor. The reserve was initiated by a 9-acre (3.6 ha) donation from Robert T. Orr in 1945, with   donated since 1947 by the Save the Redwoods League.

Between 1999 and 2004, the tallest tree in Montgomery Woods, named the Mendocino Tree, was the world's tallest known tree. It was displaced by the discovery of a number of taller trees in Humboldt Redwoods State Park and later Redwood National Park in Humboldt County. The tree is one of dozens of similar height in the grove, and was never specifically marked in order to protect the tree. Earlier well-publicized candidates for the world's tallest tree suffered damage from stresses resulting from crowds of tourists.

References

External links
 Montgomery Woods State Natural Reserve

State parks of California
Parks in Mendocino County, California
Protected areas established in 1945
1945 establishments in California
Old-growth forests